Stigmatopteris is a genus of ferns in the family Dryopteridaceae, subfamily Polybotryoideae, in the Pteridophyte Phylogeny Group classification of 2016 (PPG I).

Species
, the Checklist of Ferns and Lycophytes of the World accepted the following species:

Stigmatopteris alloeoptera (Kunze) C.Chr.
Stigmatopteris brevinervis (Fée) R.C.Moran
Stigmatopteris bulbifera R.C.Moran
Stigmatopteris carrii (Baker) C.Chr.
Stigmatopteris caudata (Raddi) C.Chr.
Stigmatopteris contracta (Christ) C.Chr.
Stigmatopteris gemmipara C.Chr.
Stigmatopteris hemiptera (Maxon) C.Chr.
Stigmatopteris heterocarpa (Fée) Rosenst.
Stigmatopteris heterophlebia (Baker) R.C.Moran
Stigmatopteris ichtiosma (Sodiro) C.Chr.
Stigmatopteris jamaicensis (Desv.) Proctor
Stigmatopteris killipiana Lellinger
Stigmatopteris lechleri (Mett.) C.Chr.
Stigmatopteris litoralis Rosenst.
Stigmatopteris longicaudata (Liebm.) C.Chr.
Stigmatopteris michaelis (Baker) C.Chr.
Stigmatopteris nephrodioides (Klotzsch) C.Chr.
Stigmatopteris opaca (Baker) C.Chr.
Stigmatopteris pellucidopunctata (C.Chr.) C.Chr.
Stigmatopteris prionites (Kunze) C.Chr.
Stigmatopteris pterorhachis R.C.Moran
Stigmatopteris rotundata (Humb. & Bonpl. ex Willd.) C.Chr.
Stigmatopteris sordida (Maxon) C.Chr.
Stigmatopteris tijuccana (Raddi) C.Chr.
Stigmatopteris ulei (Christ) Sehnem

References

Dryopteridaceae
Fern genera